Igor Tratnik (born June 14, 1989) is a Slovenian professional basketball player for KD Slovan of the Slovenian Second League. He is a 2.07 m (6 ft 8 in) tall forward. He played for Slovenia at the 2007 FIBA Europe Under-18 Championship.

Career

Iceland
Tratnik joined KFÍ in January 2010 and helped them win the Division I and achieve promotion to the Úrvalsdeild karla. In 8 games he averaged 21.3 points, 13.1 rebounds and 3.0 blocks.

In 2011, Tratnik joined Úrvalsdeild club Valur. After averaging 15.5 points and 10.6 rebounds in 13 games, which were all losses, he left the team in January 2012 and tried to sign with Tindastóll, without the approval of Valur where he still had an active contract. On February 2, the teams reached an agreement of a buyout and Tratnik signed with Tindastóll that same day. In 10 regular season and playoffs games with Tindastóll, Tratnik averaged 8.7 points and 8.0 rebounds.

Slovenia
In 2013, Tratnik agreed a contract with KK Portorož, where he became the MVP of the first week of the 2013–14 Slovenian Basketball League, after scoring 25 points in the 92–70 away loss against KK Hopsi Polzela.

In Summer 2014 he signed with Zlatorog Laško, where he became two times MVP of the week in the 2014–15 Slovenian Basketball League.

In July 2015, Tratnik moved to KK Krka. He terminated his contract on March 14, 2016.

On March 18, 2016, KK Šentjur announced that they had signed a contract with Tratnik.

On December 13, 2017, Tratnik signed with Petrol Olimpija for the rest of the 2017–18 season.

On September 29, 2021, Tratnik signed with KD Slovan of the Slovenian Second League.

References

External links
ABA League Profile
Profile at FEB.es
Profile at FIBA Europe
Profile at Realgm.com
Slovenian statistics at kzs.si
Icelandic statistics at kki.is

1989 births
Living people
Basketball players from Ljubljana
ABA League players
KK Grosuplje players
KK Krka players
KK Olimpija players
KK Zlatorog Laško players
KK Šentjur players
Slovenian men's basketball players
Ungmennafélagið Tindastóll men's basketball players
Úrvalsdeild karla (basketball) players
Valur men's basketball players
Vestri men's basketball players
Forwards (basketball)
Helios Suns players